Bull Lake is a lake in York County, New Brunswick.

Description
The lake is marshy and is reputed to have a quicksand bottom.

References

Lakes of New Brunswick
Landforms of York County, New Brunswick